Laura Davis (born April 21, 1984) is an American medley swimmer who won the bronze medal in the women's 200 meter individual medley event at the 2003 Pan American Games.

A native of the San Francisco Bay Area city of Concord, she graduated from Stanford University, is completing a Master of Science in Nursing at Samuel Merritt University and, as a member of the Terrapins Team, continues her swimming career.

Achievements
Competed in three Olympic Trials; 2000, 2004, and 2008.
Stanford Varsity Swim Team Captain 2005-2006
NCAA post-graduate scholarship finalist, 2006;
Division I All-American Athlete
Pac-10 Scholar-Athlete Award 2003, 2004, 2005, and 2006
California Scholarship Federation Seal Bearer 2002
USA Swimming Scholastic All American (#1 ranking) 2000–2002,
C.I.F.S. Scholar Athlete 1999-2002
National Champion, 200 IM

References

1984 births
Living people
American female medley swimmers
People from Concord, California
Samuel Merritt University alumni
Stanford Cardinal women's swimmers
Swimmers at the 2003 Pan American Games
Pan American Games bronze medalists for the United States
Pan American Games medalists in swimming
Medalists at the 2003 Pan American Games
21st-century American women